The 2011 Martyr's Memorial B-Division League season, also known as Martyrs Memorial RedBull 'B' Division League Football Tournament 2068 for sponsorship reasons, was the 2011 edition of the second-tier club football competition in Nepal. The season started on 24 August and ended on 27 September 2011. All matches were played at Nepal Police Foundation Ground.

Teams

Venues
The league was played centrally in one venues in Kathmandu. However, commentators complained that the ground was not ready to host the league, with no line markings on the first match day. Goal Nepal argues that the dust that the ground was covered in, caused chest infections among players.

League table

Notes

References

Martyr's Memorial B-Division League seasons
2